Ron Taylor (c. 1940 – March 6, 2014) was an American football coach and player.  As the starting quarterback at the University of Missouri, he led the Tigers to back-to-back Orange Bowl appearances during 1959 and 1960 seasons.

Raised in Chillicothe, Illinois, Taylor played quarterback for the Chillicothe Township Grey Ghosts. His father George coached both Ron and his younger brother Tim in high school. He completed a B.S. degree in education at the University of Missouri in 1962.

Taylor began his coaching career as the head coach of Joplin High School in Joplin, Missouri from 1964 to 1966, where he led the Eagles to a 17–12–2 record. 

In 1975, Taylor became the head football coach at Truman State University where he led the Bulldogs to a 26–14–2 record over four seasons. During his time at Truman, he coached future NFL head coach Gregg Williams. 

From 1988 to 1990, Taylor served as the head coach at Scotland County R-I High School in Memphis, Missouri.

Taylor served as the head coach at Quincy University in Quincy, Illinois from 1993 to 1996 after serving as the team's offensive coordinator from 1991 to 1992. He compiled a record of 22–15 as the head coach of the Hawks. He led the program to two Illini-Badger Football Conference titles in 1993 and 1994.

Head coaching record

References

Year of birth missing
1940s births
2014 deaths
Place of birth missing
People from Chillicothe, Illinois
American football quarterbacks
Missouri Tigers football players
High school football coaches in Missouri
Quincy Hawks football coaches
Truman Bulldogs football coaches
Deaths from lung cancer